Brooms (Cytisus, Genista, etc.) are used as food plants by the larvae of a number of Lepidoptera species including:

Monophagous
Species which feed exclusively on brooms

 Coleophoridae
 Several species of Coleophora case-bearers:
 C. bilineatella - only on dyer's broom (Genista tinctoria)
 C. genistae - only on Genista anglica
 C. saturatella
 C. trifariella
 C. vibicella - only on dyer's broom (Genista tinctoria)

Polyphagous
Species which feed on brooms among other plants

 Arctiidae
 Garden tiger moth (Arctia caja)
 Gelechiidae
 Chionodes distinctella
 Geometridae
 Double-striped pug (Gymnoscelis rufifasciata)
 Engrailed (Ectropis crepuscularia)
 Mottled beauty (Alcis repandata)
 Streak (Chesias legatella)
 Noctuidae
 Nutmeg (Discestra trifolii)

External links

Brooms
+Lepidoptera